Drobtinci is a village in the Municipality of Apače in northeastern Slovenia.

References

External links 
Drobtinci on Geopedia

Populated places in the Municipality of Apače